Erico Constantino da Silva (born 20 July 1989), commonly known as Erico, is a Brazilian footballer who plays as centre back for UTA Arad. His twin brother Élton Constantino da Silva is also a footballer.

Honours
Pandurii Târgu Jiu
Cupa Ligii runner-up: 2014–15
Astra Giurgiu
Cupa României runner-up: 2018–19

References

External links
 
 

1989 births
Sportspeople from Bahia
Living people
Brazilian footballers
Association football defenders
Botafogo Futebol Clube (SP) players
Sociedade Esportiva Palmeiras players
Rio Branco Esporte Clube players
Guaratinguetá Futebol players
FC Universitatea Cluj players
CS Pandurii Târgu Jiu players
FC Astra Giurgiu players
FC UTA Arad players
Liga I players
Sabail FK players
Azerbaijan Premier League players
Brazilian expatriate footballers
Expatriate footballers in Romania
Brazilian expatriate sportspeople in Romania
Expatriate footballers in Azerbaijan
Brazilian expatriate sportspeople in Azerbaijan